Rangbaz (English: The Gambat) is a 1973 Bangladeshi film starring Razzak, Kabori and Anwar Hossain opposite them. The song "Hoi Hoi Hoi Rongeela Re", by Bashir Ahmed became hit. The film introduced the idea of 'anti-hero' in Bangladeshi cinema. Razzaq played an angry youngman in the film. On 23 August 2017, the film was declared as one of the top 10 films of Razzaq by Kaler Kantho. It also stars Hashmat and Anwar Hossain. On his death in 2017, Channel I online labelled him as the first 'Rangbaz'of Bengali cinema.

Plot

Cast
 Kabori
 Razzak
 Anwar Hossain
 Hashmot
 Khalilur Rahman Babar

Soundtrack
All music composed by Anwar Parvez.

References

External links

1973 films
Bengali-language Bangladeshi films
Films scored by Anwar Pervez (musician)
1970s Bengali-language films